Peltigera papuana is a lichenized fungus in the family Peltigeraceae. It was described in 2009 from Madang Province of Papua New Guinea, from which it obtained its specific epithet. Genetic analysis of both the mycobiont and the photobiont, which is a Nostoc cyanobacterium, suggests that the evolutionary origin of Pelitgera papuana is from an ancient dispersal event from South America, although this remains inconclusive.

Classification
Peltigera papuana is part of the Peltigera rufescens group and it is most related to Peltigera granulosa, Peltigera laciniata, and Peltigera wulingensis. Genetically, the monophyly of Peltigera papuana is not well supported. It has high intraspecific variation in its internal transcribed spacer-region, which is commonly used in phylogeny. This variation may indicate the presence of multiple unrecognized species within P. papuana.

Chemistry
Thin layer chromatography did not reveal any secondary metabolites  in Peltigera papuana that could serve as characters to distinguish between species. However, the absence of such compounds could serve as an accessory identifier of the species.

References

papuana
Lichen species
Lichens described in 2009
Lichens of New Guinea
Taxa named by Emmanuël Sérusiaux